The 1960 NCAA College Division basketball tournament involved 32 schools playing in a single-elimination tournament to determine the national champion of men's NCAA College Division college basketball as a culmination of the 1959-60 NCAA College Division men's basketball season. It was won by the University of Evansville and Evansville's Ed Smallwood was the Most Outstanding Player.

Regional participants

Regionals

Northeast - Winooski, Vermont
Location: unknown Host: Saint Michael's College

Third Place - Assumption 94, Le Moyne 68

South - Owensboro, Kentucky
Location: Owensboro Sportscenter Host: Kentucky Wesleyan College

Third Place - Belmont Abbey 70, Johnson C. Smith 59

East - Staten Island, New York
Location: Sutter Gym Host: Wagner College

Third Place - Upsala 74, Drexel 69

Mideast - Evansville, Indiana
Location: Roberts Municipal Stadium Host: Evansville College

Third Place - Buffalo 53, Arkansas State 52

Great Lakes - Wheaton, Illinois
Location: Alumni Gymnasium Host: Wheaton College

Third Place - Milwaukee 109, Augustana 82

Pacific Coast - Fresno, California
Location: North Gym Host: Fresno State College

Third Place - Trinity 72, San Francisco State 64

Midwest - Galesburg, Illinois
Location: Memorial Gym Host: Knox College

Third Place - South Dakota State 93, Wartburg 77

Southwest - Kirksville, Missouri
Location: Pershing Arena Host: Northeast Missouri State Teachers College

Third Place - Lamar 88, Colorado College 67

*denotes each overtime played

National Finals - Evansville, Indiana
Location: Roberts Municipal Stadium Host: Evansville College

Third Place - Kentucky Wesleyan 86, Cornell 76

*denotes each overtime played

All-tournament team
 Gary Auten (Kentucky Wesleyan)
 Tom Cooke (Chapman)
 William Jones (American)
 Ed Smallwood (Evansville)
 Dale Wise (Evansville)

See also
 1960 NCAA University Division basketball tournament
 1960 NAIA Basketball Tournament

References

Sources
 2010 NCAA Men's Basketball Championship Tournament Records and Statistics: Division II men's basketball Championship
 1960 NCAA College Division Men's Basketball Tournament jonfmorse.com

NCAA Division II men's basketball tournament
Tournament
NCAA College Division basketball tournament
NCAA College Division basketball tournament